XHYO-FM/XEYO-AM is a radio station on 102.1 FM and 560 AM in Huatabampo, Sonora. It is owned by Manuel Oswaldo Alvarado Quintero and known as Radio Lobo with a grupera format.

History
XEYO received its concession on March 16, 1990. The station was approved to migrate to FM in September 2013 and signed on in January 2016.

References

Radio stations in Sonora